Kantvilasia is a lichen genus in the family Pilocarpaceae. This is a monotypic genus, containing the single species Kantvilasia hians.

The genus and species were described in 2000 by Patrick McCarthy, John Elix and Emmanuël Sérusiaux, and the genus name honours Australian lichenologist Gintaras Kantvilas.

References

Pilocarpaceae
Lichen genera
Monotypic Lecanorales genera
Taxa described in 2000
Taxa named by John Alan Elix
Taxa named by Emmanuël Sérusiaux